We're All Leaving is the sixth studio album by Canadian singer-songwriter Dave Gunning. It was released in 2009 by Wee House of Music.

The album received a nomination in the Folk Recording of the Year category at the 2011 East Coast Music Awards.

Track listing

Personnel
Dave Gunning  –  guitars, vocals, harmony vocals
Jamie Robinson  –  guitars, guitars, mandolin, programming, harmony vocals, piano on "Big Shoes", organ on "Ashen Town  
Jamie Gatti  –  acoustic upright bass
Kim Dunn  –  organ and piano
Adam Dowling  –  drums, percussion
Julian Marentette –  percussion
Bruce Guthro  –  vocal on "Something I'm Missing"
Rose Cousins –  vocal on "As Far As This Town Goes"
Sara DeLong Gunning –  harmony vocal on "We're All Leaving"

Production
 Tim Branton – mastering
Steven Wark – design
 James Stewart Photography – photography except song booklet pages 3&6, Stockxpert

References

2009 albums
Dave Gunning albums